Billy Cook (2 March 1890 – 1974) was an English footballer who played for Sheffield United and Worksop Town. He was a lightweight but useful full back, a two footed tackler and solid defender.

Club career

Billy Cook started playing with Hebburn Argyle where he took over the position vacated by Jack English. In April 1912 he transferred to Sheffield United where he became a first team regular. He stayed at the club for over 15 years but never scored a goal despite making over 300 appearances. The sides he played in were successful, however, and he was twice an FA Cup winner with the Blades, in 1915 and 1925.

He transferred to Worksop Town in August 1927.

Honours
Sheffield United
FA Cup: Winners 1915
FA Cup: Winners 1925

References

1890 births
1974 deaths
English footballers
Hebburn Argyle F.C. players
Sheffield United F.C. players
Worksop Town F.C. players
English Football League players
English Football League representative players
Association football fullbacks
FA Cup Final players